Colton Yellow Horn (born May 5, 1987) is a Canadian professional ice hockey left winger currently playing for Coventry Blaze in the UK Elite Ice Hockey League (EIHL). Yellow Horn most recently played for fellow Elite League side Glasgow Clan.

Playing career
Yellow Horn played major junior beginning in 2003–04 in the Western Hockey League (WHL) with the Lethbridge Hurricanes and Tri-City Americans. In five seasons play in the league, he consistently scored beyond a point-per-game pace. In 2007–08, he tallied a league-leading 48 goals and a major junior career-high 97 points (third in league scoring) with the Americans and was named to the WHL West First All-Star Team.  Despite Yellow Horn's offensive production as a junior, he went undrafted by an NHL team.

In 2008–09, Yellow Horn turned pro, going overseas to Austria to play for EC Red Bull Salzburg of the Erste Bank Eishockey Liga (EBEL). On January 28, 2009, however, he moved back to North America mid-season, signing with the Elmira Jackals of the minor league ECHL.  On October 28, 2009, Yellow Horn was traded to the Stockton Thunder.

In the 2012–13 season, Yellow Horn was called up from the Ontario Reign of the ECHL to the Manchester Monarchs of the AHL on February 7, 2013. After making his long-awaited AHL debut, Yellow Horn proved his scoring prowess by contributing 18 points in just 28 games for Manchester to remain with the club for duration of the year.

On June 27, 2013, Yellow Horn decided to return abroad to the familiar Austrian Hockey League, signing a one-year deal with Hungarian club, SAPA Fehérvár AV19.

On September 3, 2014, Yellow Horn continued his journeyman career in agreeing to a one-year contract with Japanese club, Nippon Paper Cranes of the ALIH.

On June 12, 2015, Yellow Horn signed a contract with the Czech team HC Orli Znojmo of the Austrian Hockey League (EBEL). He made 53 appearances in the 2015-16 regular season, tallying 28 goals and 29 assists and also saw action in 18 playoff-contests with eight goals and 21 assists. Yellow Horn won the Ron Kennedy Trophy as the EBEL Most Valuable Player.

In April 2016, he penned a deal with HC Plzeň of the Czech Extraliga. After just 11 games in the ELH, Yellow Horn returned to previous club, Orli Znojmo, of the EBEL. In April 2018, he signed an initial one-year deal with the Graz 99ers, his fourth club of the EBEL.

After spells with HK Nitra in the Slovak Extraliga and Erste Liga side HSC Csíkszereda, Yellow Horn agreed terms with UK EIHL side Glasgow Clan for the 2021-22 season.

After a season with Glasgow, Yellow Horn agreed terms for the 2022–23 season with fellow Elite League club Coventry Blaze.

Personal life
Yellow Horn grew up in the Piikani Nation tribe of Brocket, Alberta.

Career statistics

Regular season and playoffs

International

Awards and honours

References

External links

1987 births
Living people
Fehérvár AV19 players
Allen Americans players
Canadian ice hockey left wingers
Coventry Blaze players
EC Red Bull Salzburg players
Elmira Jackals (ECHL) players
First Nations sportspeople
Glasgow Clan players
Graz 99ers players
Ice hockey people from Alberta
Lethbridge Hurricanes players
Manchester Monarchs (AHL) players
Nippon Paper Cranes players
HK Nitra players
HSC Csíkszereda players
Ontario Reign (ECHL) players
Orli Znojmo players
HC Plzeň players
Stockton Thunder players
Tri-City Americans players
Canadian expatriate ice hockey players in Austria
Canadian expatriate ice hockey players in Hungary
Canadian expatriate ice hockey players in the United States
Canadian expatriate ice hockey players in Slovakia
Canadian expatriate ice hockey players in the Czech Republic
Canadian expatriate ice hockey players in Japan
Canadian expatriate ice hockey players in England
Canadian expatriate ice hockey players in Scotland
Canadian expatriate ice hockey players in Romania